Goodbye Girl is the third solo album by David Gates of Bread.  The "title track" was also used in the film of the same name.

"Took the Last Train" was released as a follow-up single, which also became a U.S. and Canadian top 40 hit.

Only tracks 1-4, 6 and 7 are new material; the remainder are reissued from previous albums.

Track listing
"Goodbye Girl" (2:45)
"Took the Last Train" (4:32)
"Overnight Sensation" (4:58)
"California Lady" (3:52)
"Ann" (previously released on First) (3:50)
"Drifter" (3:37)
"He Don't Know How to Love You" (2:43)
"Suite: Clouds, Rain" (previously released on First) (8:52)
"Lorilee" (previously released on First) (4:42)
"Part-Time Love" (previously released on Never Let Her Go) (2:23)
"Sunday Rider" (previously released on First) (3:21)
"Never Let Her Go" (previously released on Never Let Her Go) (3:07)

Charts

Personnel
"Goodbye Girl"
David Gates – vocals, piano, acoustic guitar, bass
Dean Parks – electric guitar
Mike Botts - drums
"Took the Last Train"
David Gates – vocals, bass
Dean Parks – guitar
Larry Knechtel – piano, moog synthesizer
Jim Horn – alto saxophone
Mike Botts – drums
"Overnight Sensation"
David Gates – vocals, acoustic guitar
Larry Knechtel – bass
Dean Parks – guitar solo
Mike Botts – drums
"California Lady"
David Gates – vocals, rhythm guitar
Larry Knechtel – bass
Dean Parks – guitar solo
Mike Botts – drums
"Ann"
David Gates – vocals, guitar, bass
"Drifter"
David Gates – vocals, acoustic guitar
Larry Knechtel – bass
Dean Parks – electric guitar solo
Mike Botts – drums
Dan Dugmore – steel guitar
David Lindley – fiddle
"He Don't Know How to Love You" 
David Gates – vocals, acoustic guitar
Larry Knechtel – bass
Dean Parks – guitar solo
Mike Botts – drums
"Clouds Suite Clouds"
David Gates – vocals, piano, moog
Larry Knechtel – bass
Russ Kunkel – drums
"Clouds Suite Rain"
David Gates – vocals, piano, guitar
Larry Knechtel – bass, moog solos
Jim Gordon – drums
"Lorilee"
David Gates – vocals, electric guitar, bass
Larry Knechtel – electric piano, organ
Jim Gordon – drums
Mike Botts – drums, congas
Jim Horn – alto saxophone
"Part-Time Love"
David Gates – vocals, acoustic guitar, bass
Larry Knechtel – electric piano
"Sunday Rider"
David Gates – vocals, rhythm guitar
Larry Knechtel – bass
John Guerin – drums
Larry Carlton – guitar solo

References

1978 albums
David Gates albums
Elektra Records albums
Wounded Bird Records albums